Challedon (1936–1958) was an American Hall of Fame Champion Thoroughbred racehorse. Bred in Maryland by William L. Brann and  Robert S. Castle, he raced under the colors of their Branncastle Farm.

Two-year-old-season
Racing at age two, Challedon won four of his six but was outshone by another colt named El Chico, who was voted that year's U.S. Champion 2-Yr-Old Colt.

Three-year-old-season 
At age three, under jockey George Seabo, Challedon finished second in the 1939 Kentucky Derby, eight lengths behind future Hall of Fame colt Johnstown. Then, in the Preakness Stakes, Challedon won by a length and a half with the heavily favored Johnstown finishing off the board. For trainer Louis J. Schaefer, Challedon's win meant he became the first person to have both ridden and trained a Preakness Stakes winner. His feat would only be matched 30 years later by Johnny Longden. Challedon wasn't eligible to compete in the final leg of the U.S. Triple Crown and as such Johnstown had an easy time in winning the Belmont Stakes. However, Challedon's wins in eight other important races that year, including a world record performance in the Tranter Purse raced at Keeneland Race Course, earned him the U.S. Champion 3-Yr-Old Colt honors. In a poll conducted by the Turf and Sport Digest, Challedon was voted Horse of the Year, taking 156 of the possible 208 votes ahead of the two-year-old Bimelech, who received 36.

Four-year-old-season 
In 1940, the four-year-old Challedon continued his winning ways, claiming victory under jockey George Woolf in the Hollywood Gold Cup and the Whitney Stakes. Beginning in September 1940, Don Cameron trained Challedon for owner William L. Brann and won the Pimlico Special and Havre de Grace Handicap. Challedon still remains the only two-time winner of the prestigious grade one Pimlico Special Handicap. Cameron left Brann's employ in February 1941 and the horse's training was taken over by Whitey Whitehill. Challedon was voted 1940 U.S. Champion Male Handicap Horse and for the second straight year earned U.S. Horse of the Year honors, topping the Turf and Sport Digest poll with 84 votes ahead of Seabiscuit who received 34.

Five-year-old season 

As a five-year-old, Challedon suffered a tendon injury and was bothered by cracks on the inside of a forefoot that saw him win no purse money. His season ended after just three races. The following year, for new trainer Edward Christmas Challedon returned to the winner's circle twice, including in the Philadelphia Handicap, but had lost his drive and was retired to stand at stud at Gallaher Farm in Lexington, Kentucky.

While not a spectacular success as a sire, Challedon did produce thirteen stakes winners before passing away at the age of twenty-two after breaking a leg in his paddock. In 1977, he was inducted into the United States' National Museum of Racing and Hall of Fame.

Breeding

References

External links 
 Challedon's pedigree and racing stats
 Challedon at the United States National Museum of Racing and Hall of Fame
 Challedon's offspring at the Triple Crown database by Kathleen Irwin and Joy Reeves

1936 racehorse births
1958 racehorse deaths
Racehorses bred in Maryland
Racehorses trained in the United States
Preakness Stakes winners
American Thoroughbred Horse of the Year
United States Thoroughbred Racing Hall of Fame inductees
Thoroughbred family 12-c